A yig mgo is a textual caret mark in Tibetan script which is one of the possible markers for a new text or page. In some cases, such as following an internal title page, a triple yig mgo is used. Various forms of yig mgo are included in the Unicode character set for Tibetan, including:
 ,
 ,
 ,
 ,
 ,
 .

References

See also
 Javanese script, which also has various marks for beginning a text or a page that are used respectively by the reader's age or social status.

Tibetan script
Punctuation